Johnny Shepherd (born April 24, 1957) was a star college football running back and the Rookie of the Year in the Canadian Football League.

College career
Shepherd started his college career at Liberty University, where he was the team leading rusher in 1978 with 529 yards. He moved to Livingston University (now The University of West Alabama), where he was named Honorable Mention All-American in 1982, All-Gulf South Conference in 1981 and 1982 and is a member of UWA's Team of the Decade from the 1980s. He still sits atop the UWA career rushing chart with 2,057 yards on 387 carries and holds the career per-rush average (5.32). He also scored 26 rushing touchdowns in his career and scored 156 points. He owns the single-season record for rushing touchdowns with 13, rushing yards with 955, touchdowns scored with 15 and rushing attempts with 183. He also owns the single-game rushing record of 189 yards versus Tennessee-Martin in 1982. He was inducted into the UWA Hall of Fame in 1997.

Professional career
Undrafted by the National Football League, Shepherd headed to the Canadian Football League in 1983, where he played with the Hamilton Tiger-Cats. Rushing for 1069 yards in his first season, he was an all-star and winner of the CFL's Most Outstanding Rookie Award. He played for two more seasons, but was hampered by injuries. Most notably, he scored a touchdown in 1985's 73rd Grey Cup, when Hamilton lost to the B.C. Lions.

In 1987, he played 2 games for the Buffalo Bills, as a strike replacement player, rushing 12 times for 42 yards and catching one pass. He finished his career in the Arena Football League, with the New York Knights in 1988, rushing 24 times for 85 yards, catching one pass, scoring 5 touchdowns, and making 29 tackles.

Personal life
Shepherd now lives in Garner, North Carolina with his wife and two daughters Kanita, Letisha, and Jaraea

References
Canadian Pro Football by Terry Jones (Paperjacks, Markham Ontario)
UWA All-Americans list
Arena Fans online
Johnny Shepherd at databaseFootball.com

External links
Hamilton Tiger Cats All-Time Roster
AFL stats

1957 births
Living people
Liberty Flames football players
West Alabama Tigers football players
American players of Canadian football
Canadian football running backs
Hamilton Tiger-Cats players
Buffalo Bills players
People from La Grange, North Carolina
Players of American football from North Carolina
Canadian Football League Rookie of the Year Award winners
New York Knights (arena football) players
People from Garner, North Carolina